Jurong West Sports and Recreation Centre is a centre for sports and recreational activities. It was officially opened to the public on 10 November 2006. It is the largest integrated sports centre in Singapore.

Location
The stadium is located in Jurong West, near Pioneer MRT station.

History
The stadium was opened in 2006, and served temporary as the home stadium for Tampines Rovers FC from 2015 to 2017. It is currently the home stadium for Young Lions FC.

Facilities & Structures

Stadium
Jurong West Stadium is a multi-purpose stadium used mostly for football matches and which also used to be the temporary home stadium of S.League outfit, Tampines Rovers FC from 2015 to 2017. It is currently the home stadium for Young Lions FC. The stadium has a seating capacity of 4,200 with Tampines Rovers FC as its tenant. The stadium is also second-in-line to host international football matches, behind Jalan Besar Stadium and ahead of the Marina Bay Floating Platform.

There is a dedicated space for inline skating and dual usage for inline skating on the running track as well.

Swimming Complex
Jurong West Swimming Complex is the first swimming complex in Singapore to feature a sheltered olympic-sized swimming pool, amongst others such as a teaching pool, jacuzzi, kiddy pool, lazy river and a water playground. It has a seating capacity of 465.

Sports Hall
The sports hall consists of the Jurong West Tennis Centre, badminton court and a gymnasium.

Transport
The stadium is accessible by car, and it is a short walk from Pioneer MRT station.

See also
Pioneer
Nanyang
List of stadiums in Singapore

References

External links
SSC Government

Sports venues in Singapore
Football venues in Singapore
Jurong West
Pioneer, Singapore
Multi-purpose stadiums in Singapore
Singapore Premier League venues
Gombak United FC
2006 establishments in Singapore
Sports venues completed in 2006